Millones de Semillita is a 1950 Argentine film. Beatriz Taibo made her film debut in this film.

Cast included
 Beatriz Taibo

References

External links
 

1950 films
1950s Spanish-language films
Argentine black-and-white films
Argentine comedy films
1950 comedy films
1950s Argentine films